Grab This! is an album by jazz saxophonist Johnny Griffin which was recorded in 1962 and released on the Riverside label.

Reception

The Allmusic site awarded the album 4 stars stating "Grab This! finds tenor Johnny Griffin in a soul-jazz mood... It's amazing that five guys were able to get together and cut this album for Riverside in one day during the summer of 1962... Grab This! is a fine album, and serves as a reminder of Griffin's lovely tenor sound".

Track listing
All compositions by Johnny Griffin except as indicated
 "Grab This!" - 6:06  
 "63rd Street Theme" - 5:34  
 "Don't Get Around Much Anymore" (Duke Ellington, Bob Russell) - 8:37  
 "Offering Time" (Paul Bryant) - 6:16  
 "These Foolish Things" (Harry Link, Holt Marvell, Jack Strachey) - 6:39  
 "Cherry Float" - 5:29

Personnel
Johnny Griffin — tenor saxophone
Paul Bryant - organ
Joe Pass - guitar
Jimmy Bond  - bass
Doug Sides - drums

References 

1962 albums
Johnny Griffin albums
Riverside Records albums
Albums produced by Orrin Keepnews